The 2023 Texas Longhorns baseball team represents the University of Texas at Austin during the 2023 NCAA Division I baseball season.
The Longhorns play their home games at UFCU Disch–Falk Field as a member of the Big 12 Conference.
They are led by head coach David Pierce, in his 7th season at Texas.

Previous season

Regular Season
Texas finished the regular season 39–17, 14–10 in Big 12 play. In non-conference play, Texas went 25-7 never being swept once. Against ranked opponents, Texas went 5–6. Over conference play, Texas won 5 series, while losing 3. Texas won series over Oklahoma, TCU, Baylor, West Virginia, and Kansas. Out of the 5 series won, Texas swept Baylor and Kansas. The 3 series that were lost were to Texas Tech, Kansas State, and Oklahoma State. Oklahoma State was the only team that swept Texas over the course of the regular season. Heading into the Big 12 tournament, Texas finished 5th in the conference regular season earning a 5-seed in the conference tournament.

Big 12 tournament
With Texas earning a 5-seed in the Big 12 tournament, they faced off against 4-seed Oklahoma State. After defeating Oklahoma State, TCU, and Oklahoma State again, Texas advanced to the championship game against Oklahoma. In the championship game, Oklahoma defeated Texas 8–1. Skyler Messinger, Douglas Hodo III, and Pete Hansen earned Big 12 All-Tournament Team honors.

NCAA tournament

Austin Regional
Due to a late push from Texas, they earned a regional host spot. In the first round of regionals, Texas faced off against Air Force. Against Air Force, Texas won 11–3 advancing them to the second round against Louisiana Tech. In the second round Texas defeated Louisiana Tech 5–2. After Air Force defeated Louisiana Tech in the losers bracket, Texas defeated Air Force 10–1 in the championship game advancing the Longhorns to Super Regionals.

Greenville Super Regional
Due to RPI rankings, Texas had to travel to Greenville, North Carolina to face ECU in the Grenville Super Regional. In the first game of the three game series, Texas lost game one 7–13. In the second round, Texas won 9–8 forcing a game three. In game three, Texas defeated ECU 11–1 sending the Longhorns to their 38th College World Series.

College World Series

In the first round of the College World Series, Texas matched up against Notre Dame. Against Notre Dame, Texas lost 3–7. In the elimination game, Texas faced off against Texas A&M. Texas was defeated by Texas A&M 2–10, ending their season.

Personnel

Roster 

Roster Notes

Starters

Coaches

Support Staff

Offseason

Departures

Outgoing Transfers

2022 MLB Draft

Undrafted Free Agents

Coaching staff departures

Coaching Staff Notes

Acquisitions

Incoming Transfers

Incoming Recruits

Coaching Staff Additions

Preseason

Big 12 media poll

Source:

Preseason Big 12 awards and honors

Schedule and results 
{| class="toccolours" width=100% style="margin:1.5em auto; text-align:center;"
|-style=""
! colspan=2|2023 Texas Longhorns Baseball Game Log (14–7)
|-
! colspan=2 | Legend:       = Win       = Loss       = Canceled      Bold = Texas team member
|-style=""
! colspan=2 |Regular Season (14–7)
|- valign="top"
|

|-
|
|- 
| * indicates a non-conference game. All rankings from D1Baseball on the date of the contest. Source:
|}

Schedule Notes

Statistics

Individual pitching
All Statastics through March 20, 2023

Team batting

Team pitching

Individual batting
Note: leaders must meet the minimum requirement of 2 PA/G and 75% of games played

Individual pitching
Note: leaders must meet the minimum requirement of 1 IP/G

Source:

Awards and honors

Rankings

References

Texas
Texas Longhorns baseball seasons
Texas Longhorns baseball